() or Route 36 is a primary road in southern Iceland. The road forms the main route from Reykjavík to Þingvellir and forms part of the Golden Circle around Þingvallavatn. The road is 68 km long.

Route
Starting from its junction with Route 35 in Þrastarskógi north of Selfoss, the road runs north along the western shore of Þingvallavatn. The road runs around the north of Thingvellir where it connects with Uxahryggir (Route 52) and Route 550.

The route then heads west towards Reykjavík. Halfway along it junctions with Kjós Pass Road (Route 48) in Háheiðinni. The road ends at the Ring Road just outside Reykjavík.

References

Roads in Iceland